The Temple of Bel, sometimes also referred to as the "Temple of Baal", was an ancient temple located in Palmyra, Syria. The temple, consecrated to the Mesopotamian god Bel, worshipped at Palmyra in triad with the lunar god Aglibol and the sun god Yarhibol, formed the center of religious life in Palmyra and was dedicated in AD 32.  The temple would have been closed during the persecution of pagans in the late Roman Empire in a campaign against the temples of the East made by Maternus Cynegius, Praetorian Prefect of Oriens, between 25 May 385 to 19 March 388.      Its ruins were considered among the best preserved at Palmyra, until they were further destroyed by the Islamic State in August 2015. The arched main entrance into the temple is still intact, as well as its exterior walls and fortified gate.

History

The temple was built on a tell with stratification indicating human occupation that goes back to the third millennium BC. The area was occupied in pre-Roman periods with a former temple that is usually referred to as "the first temple of Bel" and "the Hellenistic temple". The walls of the temenos and propylaea were constructed in the late first and the first half of the second century AD. The names of three Greeks who worked on the construction of the temple of Bel are known through inscriptions, including a probably Greek architect named Alexandras. However, many Palmyrenes adopted Greco-Roman names and native citizens with the name Alexander are attested in the city.

The Temple of Bel was converted into a Christian church during the Byzantine Era. Parts of the structure were modified by Arabs in 1132 which preserved the structure and converted the Temple into a mosque. The enormous temple courtyard (approx. 200 x 200 meters) held mud-brick houses among the ruins, and served as a fortified citadel for the village of Palmyra (known as Tadmur during the 1100s). The mosque in the temple proper and the dwellings remained in use until the 1920s when Franco-Syrian archaeological missions cleared the temple grounds of its postclassical elements. Most of the Corinthian columns of the inner colonnades still showed pedestals where the statues of the benefactors stood. The temple was aligned along the eastern end of the Great Colonnade at Palmyra.

Architecture

The temple showed a remarkable synthesis of ancient Near Eastern and Greco-Roman architecture. The temple remains lay inside a large precinct lined by porticos. It had a rectangular shape and was oriented north–south. On a podium in the middle of the court was the actual temple building. The cella was entirely surrounded by a prostyle of Corinthian columns, only interrupted on the long side by an entrance gate with large steps leading from the court. The cella was unique in the fact that it had two inner sanctuaries, the north and south adytons, dedicated as the shrines of Bel and other local deities. The northern chamber was known for a bas-relief carving of the seven planets known to the ancients surrounded by the twelve signs of the Zodiac and the carvings of a procession of camels and veiled women. The cella was lit by two pairs of windows cut high in the two long walls. In three corners of the building stairwells could be found that led up to rooftop terraces.

In the court there were the remains of a basin, an altar, a dining hall, and a building with niches. And in the northwest corner lay a ramp along which sacrificial animals were led into the temple area. There were three monumental gateways, of which the entry was through the west gate.

Destruction

Syria's Director of Antiquities Maamoun Abdul Karim stated that ISIL was looking for treasures and "stores of gold" in the city.
On 30 August 2015, the Associated Press reported that ISIS had partially demolished the temple by explosives, citing eyewitness accounts. The bricks and columns were reported as lying on the ground and only one wall was reported as remaining, according to a Palmyra resident. The damage was also attested by the Syrian Observatory for Human Rights. 

Syria's antiquities chief Maamoun Abdulkarim later stated that although there was an explosion within the temple's perimeter, "the basic structure is still standing". However, these reports were proved to be incorrect. 

On August 31, 2015 the United Nations confirmed the temple's destruction after reviewing satellite imagery, "We can confirm destruction of the main building of the Temple of Bel as well as a row of columns in its immediate vicinity" reported by the United Nations Institute for Training and Research (UNITAR). The BBC issued a video report showing the satellite images and the destruction described by Einar Bjorgo, manager of UN Satellite Imaging (UNOSAT UNITAR).

The main entrance arch survived the destruction of the temple. The Institute for Digital Archaeology proposed that replicas of this arch be installed in Trafalgar Square, London and Times Square, New York City. It was later decided that instead of the temple's main entrance, the replica would be of part of the Monumental Arch.

Restoration
Following the recapture of Palmyra by the Syrian Army in March 2016, director of antiquities Maamoun Abdelkarim stated that the Temple of Bel, along with the Temple of Baalshamin and the Monumental Arch, will be rebuilt using the surviving remains. ISIL recaptured the city on 11 December, but the Syrian Army retook it on 2 March 2017.

In July 2017, the French company "Art Graphique et Patrimoine" travelled to Palmyra and scanned the Temple's rubble in order to create a plan for its restoration.

Image gallery

See also
 List of Ancient Roman temples

References

Bibliography
Becker, Jeffrey A. Temple of Bel. Smarthistory

External links

Syrian embassy site with history of the site
Travel site with images
Temple of Bel, Palmyra Khan Academy

1st-century Roman temples
Ancient Roman buildings and structures in Syria
Bel
Buildings and structures in Palmyra
Former religious buildings and structures in Syria
Conversion of non-Christian religious buildings and structures into churches
Religious buildings and structures converted into mosques
Buildings and structures destroyed by ISIL
Buildings and structures demolished in 2015
Destroyed temples
32
Buildings and structures completed in the 1st century
Persecution of pagans in the late Roman Empire
Temples in Syria
Baal